Gash is a Foetus album released in 1995 by Sony/Columbia.  Gash is the only Foetus album to appear on a major label and their most widely distributed, with releases in North America, Europe, and Japan. The album spent 10 weeks on the CMJ Radio Top 150, peaking at #48. Gash is Columbia Records #CK 66461.

Track listing

Personnel
J. G. Thirlwell - all instruments and vocals, except:
Tod Ashley - bass (2, 3, 4, 5, 6, 11, 12)
Vinnie Signorelli - drums (5, 9)
Marc Ribot - guitar (3, 9, 12)
Marcellus Hall - harmonica (3)
Steve Bernstein - trumpet (2, 5, 6, 11, 12)
The Heresey Horns - horns (2, 4, 9)

Production
J. G. Thirlwell - Production, composition, arrangements, digital artwork concept and design
Rob "Rok" Sutton - Engineering
Howie Weinberg - Mastering
Steve Bernstein - Heresy Horn arrangements
Brian Wallace - Art direction
Alex Winter - Photography
Adam Sanders - Computer imaging
Richard White - Graphic artist

References

External links 
 
 Gash at foetus.org

1995 albums
Foetus (band) albums
Albums produced by JG Thirlwell
Columbia Records albums